Pollenia amentaria is a species of cluster fly in the family Polleniidae.

Distribution
Albania, Andorra, Armenia, Austria, Belgium, Bulgaria, China, Croatia, Czech Republic, Denmark, Finland, France, Germany, Great Britain, Greece, Hungary, Iran, Ireland, Italy, Macedonia, Morocco, Netherlands, Norway, Poland, Romania, Russia, Slovakia, Slovenia, Spain, Sweden, Switzerland, Ukraine, Yugoslavia.

References

Polleniidae
Insects described in 1763
Taxa named by Giovanni Antonio Scopoli
Diptera of Europe
Diptera of Asia